Defunct (no longer in use or active) may refer to:

 Defunct (video game), 2014
 Zombie process or defunct process, in Unix-like operating systems

See also 
 
 :Category:Former entities
 End-of-life product
 Obsolescence